Nedonna Beach is an unincorporated community in Tillamook County, in the U.S. state of Oregon. 
Nedonna Beach is west of U.S. Route 101 between Rockaway Beach and Nehalem Bay.

Undersea cables 

Nedonna Beach serves as the U.S. terminus of many undersea cables including:
 Trans-Pacific Express undersea cables (three separate cables)
 Southern Cross Cable.
 NorthStar owned by Alaska Communications connecting Oregon with Alaska

References

Unincorporated communities in Tillamook County, Oregon
Unincorporated communities in Oregon